Ichhu Muruq'u (Quechua ichhu Peruvian feather grass (stipa ichu), muruq'u ball (of yarn, wool), "ichhu ball", Hispanicized spelling Ichumoroco) is a mountain in the Peruvian Andes, about  high. It is located in the Puno Region, Azángaro Province, on the border of the districts Potoni and San Antón. Ichhu Muruq'u lies west of the mountain Ch'iyar Jaqhi and northeast of Yuraq Apachita and Quri Kunka.

References

Mountains of Puno Region
Mountains of Peru